Bachelor's Eve is a 2018 Nigerian romantic comedy produced by Adefajo Ayobami and directed by Rotimi Raji, the director of Truth or Die and Freezing Point (TV series). The movie was produced under the production studio of Juma productions and distributed by Metro classic pictures. The movie stars award winners actors and Actresses such as AMVCA nominee, Kehinde Bankole, AMVCA and AfroHollywood award winner, Doris Simeon.  The AMAA winner, Gbenro Ajibade (of Tinsel fame), Frankincense (Adam’s Apple/Tinsel), Jumoke Odetola (AMVCA winner), and Kehinde Olorunyomi  (GMA winner).

Synopsis 
The story revolves around a handsome playboy who is ready to get marry. However, he decided to hang around with his friends 24 hours to the wedding and there are a lot of unanswered questions that puts the marriage under probability.

Premiere 
The movie was released on February 16, 2018 across the country.

Cast 
Jumoke Odetola, Wole Ojo, Kehinde Bankole , Gbenro Ajibade, Dorris Simeon, Kehinde olorunyomi, Frankincense Eche-Brn, Bade Smart and Jennifer Ikeji

References 

2018 films
Nigerian romantic comedy-drama films
English-language Nigerian films